Rachele Guidi (11 April 1890 – 30 October 1979), also known (particularly in Italy) as Donna Rachele (Italian for "Lady Rachael") and incorrectly as Rachele Mussolini in the English-speaking world, was the second wife of Italian dictator and fascist leader Benito Mussolini.

Early life
Rachele Guidi was born in Predappio, Romagna, Kingdom of Italy (Regno d'Italia). She was born into a peasant family and was the daughter of Agostino Guidi and wife Anna Lombardi. After the death of Rachele's father, her mother became the lover of the widowed Alessandro Mussolini.

Relationship, marriage and children
In 1910, Rachele Guidi moved in with Alessandro's son, Benito Mussolini. In 1914, Mussolini married his first wife, Ida Dalser. Though the records of that marriage were destroyed by Mussolini's government, an edict from the city of Milan ordering Mussolini to make maintenance payments to "his wife Ida Dalser" and their child was overlooked. Shortly before his son, Benito Albino Mussolini, was born to Ida Dalser, Rachele Guidi and Benito Mussolini were married in a civil ceremony in Treviglio, Lombardy on 17 December 1915. In 1925, they renewed their vows in a religious service (after his rise to power).

Rachele Guidi bore five children by Benito Mussolini. Rachele and Benito Mussolini had two daughters, Edda (1910–1995) and Anna Maria (1929–1968), and three sons Vittorio (1916–1997), Bruno (1918–1941) and Romano (1927–2006).

During her husband's regime
During the reign of Mussolini's Fascist regime, Rachele Guidi was portrayed as the model Fascist housewife and mother. She remained loyal to Mussolini until the end but, on 28 April 1945, was not with him when he and his mistress, Claretta Petacci, were captured and executed by Italian partisans. Although she tried to flee from Italy after World War II, she was arrested in April 1945 in Como, close to Switzerland, by Italian partisans. She was handed to the US Army and kept on Ischia Island but was released after several months.

Final years
In her later life, Rachele Guidi ran a restaurant in her native village of Predappio. She eventually received a pension from the Italian Republic in 1975. It turned out that Mussolini had not received a salary from the state and so she could not receive a pension.

Author
With Albert Zarca, she wrote a biography of her husband that was translated into English as Mussolini: An Intimate Biography.

See also
Ida Dalser
Claretta Petacci

References

1890 births
1979 deaths
People from Predappio
Italian people of World War II
Mistresses of Benito Mussolini
Rachele
Italian restaurateurs